Westcliffe Estates (Bells Corners West), is a neighbourhood of Bells Corners in College Ward, in the west end of Ottawa, Ontario, Canada. Founded in 1969, most of the older homes in this area were built by Assaly Construction and later the Thomas C. Assaly Corporation. The Westcliffe community is characterized by significantly higher residential densities than other parts of Bells Corners. There is a multi-storey housing complex operated by Nepean Housing as well as a multi-storey seniors residence  and co-operative housing project.  Today there are a total of 1760 homes in the neighbourhood.

Westcliffe Estates: the New Community

The 1879 map of Bell's Corners, shows the lands that are now called Westcliffe as farmland and forest, owned by John Robertson, J.R. O'Grady, Owen Hammill, James Sparks and John Sparks.  A 1952 map, has the Robertson land owned by Thomas Robertson, O'Grady's by William Morrison, Hammill's land by William Hammill and the Spark's land owned by Ernest Byrne.

The 1962 zoning by-law shows plans, of what would eventually be known as Westcliffe Estates, for single-family homes (R3) on urban lots (60 x 100).  North of what would be Oberon, Mill Hill, Terrace and Waterfall were zoned for light industry (M).  By 1969, the layout for the northern section was rezoned: what would be Priam and Ariel, one side of Cymbeline and Oberon, and two small parcels on Tarquin, were designated single or double homes on smaller lots (R4); the remaining parts of Oberon and Cymbeline, Tybalt and Tarquin, garden homes and townhouses (R5).  Roadways were outlined for Westcliffe and the northern leg of Seyton.  A parcel of land to the east of Oberon was still zoned R3, as was the rest of the area.  The park areas had not been designated at this time.

The New Development

Westcliffe Estates was first developed by Assaly and Johannsen, with parcels of land later sold to other developers.  Building had started in 1969/70 with families moving into their new homes on Oberon, Cymbeline, and Ariel in 1970.  Many of these semi-detached homes were celebrated, and marketed, as fine examples of mid-century modern residential design.

1970 also saw the start of a new official plan for Nepean, which changed the face of the proposed Westcliffe Estates.  The new plan also outlined proposals for industrial/commercial development on lands north of the Bell's Corners strip.

The new plan was designed on the 'neighbourhood unit' concept, based on the distance young children could be expected to walk to school, and with a centrally located park.  Internal roads were designed to discourage through traffic, no longer on the formal grid system, and only wide enough for the required traffic volume.  Winding crescents would feed onto collector roads, which would then connect to the main arterial roads.

The 'neighbourhood unit' also designated apartment buildings and townhouses in the centre of the new community, along with single-family dwellings.  Mixed zoning was a new concept, and Westcliffe's new plan was a good blend of housing types.  The mix also included resident homeowners and rental units.

Building rapidly continued until 1976, with the completion of homes on Tarquin, Tybalt, Priam, and Westcliffe.  By this time most of the building was being done by the Thomas C. Assaly Corp.  There were four basic designs on Priam named the Chelsea, the Regency, the Rockcliffe, and the Tudor.  While on Westcliffe Road the semi-detached homes were named Ambassador, Monarch, and Diplomat. In the following years more building gradually started with the townhouses on Forester and Sonnet (1978/79), Seyton and Lovell (1982) single-family homes on Tyrrell (1983), Eileen Tallman (1985), Harmer House (1986) and single-family homes on the west ridge of the community, Seyton, Florizel, Robina, Fagus (Stonepark) and Betula (Forestview) (1989).

The Changing Face of the Community

The 1971 plan officially designated parkland, including the small parks at Priam, Florizel, and Betula (Forestview).  Lovell, the school, Betula and Florizel were still R3.  The land east of Oberon was rezoned M for light industry.  Tyrrell was zoned R4, Forester, Sonnet, Seyton and Hammill were zoned R5, for multi-family housing.  However, with the expansion of industrial and commercial development, and the ever-increasing demand for housing, developers kept coming back requesting changes to the 1971 plan.

By 1980, changes were made from R3 to I (institutional) for the Catholic school, (St. Paul, now Franco Ouest), constructed in 1978.  Lovell had been rezoned from R3 to R5, to allow for the town home clusters.  What would be Hammill, the school parking lot, Eileen Tallman, Harmer House and the corner of Tyrrell and Seyton were all rezoned R6 for apartments.

In the late 80s, the land east of Oberon nearly became residential.  Terrace, Mill Hill, and Waterfall were changed to residential, R4, R5, and R1C to allow a mixed development, and Institutional for Robertson House.  Harmer House also went from R5 to Institutional.  The land on Robertson was now mixed light industrial (M) and commercial (C).  Florizel, Robina, Betula, Fagus, and the western part of Seyton had already been zoned for mixed housing, ranging from R3 to R5.  In 1989, the R3 designation was removed to allow for larger singles on smaller lots and less townhouses.  Betula and Fagus were renamed Forestview and Stonepark.

By 1992, the school parking lot finally lost its apartment designation and became institutional (I).  Hammill Court, built by Nepean Housing in 1992, was again rezoned to allow for special mixed dwellings (R1C).  Further development took place in the north of the community on Terrace, Mill Hill and Waterfall (1986), and in 1990, Westcliffe finally got a community centre.

The New Millennium

In 2000, the City of Nepean consolidated its urban zoning by-law.
Although zoning numbers have changed on Hammill, Terrace, and Waterfall (now R7) the designation remains the same.  The Tyrrell / Seyton land (R6) was still vacant and the only land in the community that could bring change in the new millennium.

Westcliffe Estates Names

Most of the names in Westcliffe may seem quite unusual, but obviously, someone was interested in Shakespeare:  
  
 
		
Then there are street names with a nature connection:  
 	

Which leaves:

Zoning definitions and their uses

References

External links
 Westcliffe Estates Community Association (WECA)
 Westcliffe Estates Community Association on Facebook
 Ottawa Neighbourhood Study - Bells Corners West

Neighbourhoods in Ottawa